KTLZ (89.9 FM) is a radio station licensed to Cuero, Texas, United States. The station is owned by The Worship Center of Kingsville, and is a repeater of KLBD.

References

External links

TLZ